This is a list of lakes in the French overseas collectivity of Wallis and Futuna.

 
Wallis and Futuna
Lakes
Wallis and Futuna
Wallis and Futuna